Rinaca is a genus of moths in the family Saturniidae erected by Frederic Moore in 1862. It is often treated as a subgenus of Saturnia.

Species
Rinaca anna (Moore, 1865)
Rinaca antkozlovi (Brechlin, 2017)
Rinaca bieti Oberthuer, 1886
Rinaca boisduvalii (Eversmann, 1846)
Rinaca bonita (Jordan, 1911)
Rinaca cachara (Moore, 1872)
Rinaca chinensis Rebel, 1925
Rinaca chinghaina Chu & Wang, 1993
Rinaca fukudai (Sonan, 1937)
Rinaca grotei Moore, 1859
Rinaca heinrichi (Lemaire, 1976)
Rinaca japonica (Moore, 1872)
Rinaca jonasi (Butler, 1877)
Rinaca kansuensis Mell, 1939
Rinaca kitchingi Brechlin, 2001
Rinaca lindia (Moore, 1865)
Rinaca microcaligula Naessig, 1994
Rinaca naumanni Brechlin, 2001
Rinaca pelelaensis Brechlin, 2009
Rinaca shaanxiana Brechlin, 2009
Rinaca simla (Westwood, 1847)
Rinaca thibeta (Westwood, 1854)
Rinaca tsinlingshanis Mell, 1939
Rinaca winbrechlini Brechlin, 2000
Rinaca witti Brechlin, 1997
Rinaca yunnana (Mell, 1939)
Rinaca zuleika Hope, 1843

References

Saturniinae